Orotina is a canton in the Alajuela province of Costa Rica. The head city of the canton is also called Orotina.

History 
Orotina was created on 1 August 1908 by decree 39.

Geography 
Orotina has an area of  km² and a mean elevation of  metres.

The canton lies on the western side of the Coastal Mountain Range between the Jesús María River and Machuca River on the north and the Grande de Tárcoles River on the south.

Districts 
The canton of Orotina is subdivided into the following districts:
 Orotina
 El Mastate
 Hacienda Vieja
 Coyolar
 La Ceiba

Demographics 

For the 2011 census, Orotina had a population of  inhabitants.

Transportation

Road transportation 
The canton is covered by the following road routes:

References 

Cantons of Alajuela Province
Populated places in Alajuela Province